= John Engman =

American poet

John Engman (1949–1996) was an American poet from Minneapolis, Minnesota.

He published several books of poems, most notably Keeping Still, Mountain (Galileo Press, 1984) and Temporary Help: Poems (1998). He has five poems included in the anthology New American Poets of the 90s (1991): "Mushroom Clouds," "Atlantis," "Another Word for Blue," "Staff," and "One Minute of Night Sky."

He received a Loft-McKnight Writers Award in 1983 and taught courses at the University of Minnesota and St. Olaf College. A writing prize is awarded annually in his memory by his alma mater, Augsburg College in Minneapolis, MN.

Engman died at age 47 of a brain aneurysm. His obituary in the Minneapolis Star Tribune called him "an important poetic and literary voice in the Twin Cities, using as a major theme 'the wry predicament of the quickly aging youth in a foreboding adult world.'"
